Reinhold Breu (born 12 September 1970) is a German football manager and former player who works as technical director of the Lithuania national football team.

Career
Breu spent time in the academy of TSV 1860 Munich. In 1996, he signed for Austria Wien in the Austrian Bundesliga, where he made 33 appearances and scored five goals. After that, he played for First Vienna, Eintracht Trier, and Wacker Burghausen.

In December 2021 Breu was appointed as technical director in Lithuanian Football Federation, and in June 2022 as an interim manager of Lithuania national football team. In 2023 R.Breu was appointed as a manager of Lithuania U-19 team.

References

External links 
 Revolution in Luxembourg: Much more than just a dwarf uprising 
 The Hansi Flick from Luxembourg 
 Jorelaang hu mir gewaart
 Football: Reinhold Breu: "The demands of professional clubs are extreme
 Football is getting boring

1970 births
Living people
German footballers
Association football midfielders
Association football forwards
1. FC Köln II players
1. FC Köln players
FK Austria Wien players
First Vienna FC players
SV Eintracht Trier 05 players
SV Wacker Burghausen players
TSV 1860 Munich players
Regionalliga players
Austrian Football Bundesliga players
German expatriate footballers
Expatriate footballers in Austria
German expatriate sportspeople in Austria
German football managers
SV Eintracht Trier 05 managers
German expatriate football managers
Expatriate football managers in Luxembourg
German expatriate sportspeople in Luxembourg